Bettina Bunge and Katerina Maleeva were the defending champions but only Maleeva competed that year with Raffaella Reggi.

Maleeva and Reggi lost in the final 7–6, 6–1 against Mercedes Paz and Tine Scheuer-Larsen.

Seeds
Champion seeds are indicated in bold text while text in italics indicates the round in which those seeds were eliminated.

 Zina Garrison /  Kathleen Horvath (quarterfinals)
 Mercedes Paz /  Tine Scheuer-Larsen (champions)
 Katerina Maleeva /  Raffaella Reggi (final)
 Arantxa Sánchez /  Sandra Wasserman (semifinals)

Draw

References
 1988 Belgian Open Doubles Draw

Belgian Open (tennis)
1988 WTA Tour